(야마구찌조선고급학교) was a North Korean high school in Shimonoseki, Yamaguchi Prefecture, Japan.

References

Shimonoseki
Education in Yamaguchi Prefecture
High schools in Yamaguchi Prefecture
North Korean schools in Japan